This is a timeline documenting events of Jazz in the year 1956.

Events

July
 5 – The 5th Newport Jazz Festival started in Newport, Rhode Island (July 5 – 7).
 7 – Duke Ellington and his band performs at the Newport Jazz Festival. The album Ellington at Newport devises a landmark performance which is capped by an amazing tenor saxophone solo by Paul Gonsalves on "Diminuendo" and "Crescendo in Blue".

Unknown date
 The guitarist Mundell Lowe brings pianist Bill Evans to the attention of Orin Keepnews and Bill Grauer of Riverside records.
 Dizzy Gillespie meets Argentine pianist Lalo Schifrin and is impressed. Dizzy continues to gravitate to the Latin rhythms.
 Miles Davis and his quintet record four records (Cookin' , Relaxin' , Workin' and Steamin' ) for Prestige, spending only two days in the studio to complete. Miles also records  'Round about Midnight on the Columbia label.

Album releases

Art Blakey & The Jazz Messengers: The Jazz Messengers
Kenny Burrell: All Night Long
Rosemary Clooney: Blue Rose
Chris Connor: Chris Connor
Miles Davis: Round About Midnight (released 1957 - recorded 1955 and 1956)
Jimmy Giuffre: The Jimmy Giuffre Clarinet
Quincy Jones: This Is How I Feel About Jazz
Stan Kenton: Cuban Fire!
Peggy Lee: Black Coffee (Reissue)
John Lewis: Grand Encounter
Charles Mingus: Pithecanthropus Erectus
Modern Jazz Quartet: Fontessa
Phineas Newborn: Piano Artistry
Max Roach: Plus Four
Sonny Rollins 
"Sonny Rollins Plus 4"
"Tenor Madness"
"Work Time"
George Russell:The Jazz Workshop
John Serry Sr.: Squeeze Play
Horace Silver: Six Pieces of Silver
Zoot Sims: Tonite's Music Today
Jimmy Smith: A New Star A New Sound
Cecil Taylor: Jazz Advance
Lucky Thompson: Tricotism
Mel Torme: Touch
Lennie Tristano: Manhattan Studio/ New York Improvisations

Standards

Deaths

May
 13 – Don Kirkpatrick, American pianist and arranger (born 1905).
 15 – Adrian Rollini, American bass saxophonist (born 1903).
 30 – Valaida Snow, African-American jazz musician and entertainer (born 1904).

June
 11 – Frankie Trumbauer, American saxophonists (born 1901).
 26
 Clifford Brown, American trumpeter (born 1930).
 Richie Powell, American bebop pianist (born 1931).

July
 7 – Alex Hyde, American bandleader and violinist (born 1898).
 11 – Ernst Höllerhagen, German reedist (born 1912).

September
 8 – Fred Rich, Polish-born American bandleader and composer (born 1898).

October
 18 – Harry Parry, Welsh clarinetist and bandleader (born 1912).

November
 5 – Art Tatum, American pianist and virtuoso (born 1909).
 7 – Una Mae Carlisle, American singer, pianist, and songwriter (born 1915).
 20 – Achille Baquet, American clarinetist and saxophonist (born 1885).
 26 – Tommy Dorsey, American trombonist, trumpeter, composer, and bandleader (born 1905).

Unknown date
 Joe Appleton, British saxophonist and clarinetist from the West Indies (born 1900).

Births

January
 1 – Ziad Rahbani, Lebanese composer, pianist, playwright, and political commentator.
 4
 Alex Cline, American drummer.
 Nels Cline, American guitarist and composer.
 7 – Steve Williams, American drummer.
 21 – Kevin Norton, American percussionist and composer.
 23 – Ralph Carney, American saxophonist and clarinetist, Tin Huey (died 2017).
 24 – Mitchel Forman, American keyboardist.
 26 – Steve Dobrogosz, American pianist and composer.

February
 11
 Didier Lockwood, French violinist, Magma (died 2018).
 Raoul Björkenheim, Finnish-American guitarist.
 15 – Nils Landgren, Swedish trombone player.
 20 – Riccardo Del Fra, Italian upright bassist, bandleader, composer, and arranger.
 28 – Jens Wendelboe, Norwegian trombonist and orchestra leader.

March
 2 – Danilo Terenzi, Italian trombonist and composer (died 1995).
 4 – Kermit Driscoll, American bassist.

April
 2 – Károly Binder, Hungarian pianist.
 3 – Tessa Souter, English singer, songwriter, and writer.
 4 – Gary Smulyan, American baritone saxophonist.
 9 – Michael Hashim, American jazz alto saxophonist.
 16 – T Lavitz, American keyboardist, composer and producer (died 2010).
 19 – Denardo Coleman, American drummer.
 27 – Anna Lyman, Canadian Jazz, Latin Vocalist composer, and recording artist of Mexican American extraction.

May
 5 – Mary Coughlan, Irish jazz and folk singer, and actress.
 8 – Jean-Marc Jafet, French bassist and guitarist.
 13 – Oskar Aichinger, Austrian pianist.
 14 – Bruce Forman, American guitarist.
 15 – Mathias Claus, German jazz pianist and composer.
 21 – Wolfgang Puschnig, Austrian saxophonist.
 26 – Quanti Bomani, Afro-Caribbean multi-instrumentalist and composer.

June
 5 – Kenny G, American saxophonist.
 8 – Uri Caine, American pianist and composer.
 11 – Jamaaladeen Tacuma, American bassist.
 19 – Aaron Scott, American composer and drummer.
 26 – Bill Cunliffe, American jazz pianist and composer.
 27 – Maria João, Portuguese singer.

July
 5 – Billy Jenkins, English guitarist, composer, and bandleader.
 6 – John Jorgenson, American guitarist and banjo player, Desert Rose Band and Hellecasters.
 17 – Lucien Barbarin, American trombonist.
 18 – Hein van de Geyn, Dutch upright bassist, composer and band leader.
 19 – Marit Sandvik, Norwegian singer.
 21 – Franklin Kiermyer, Canadian drummer, composer and bandleader.
 24 – Denis Colin, French bass clarinettist and composer.
 26 – Wayne Krantz, American guitarist.

August
 13 – Gast Waltzing, Luxembourgian trumpeter and composer.
 15 – Lorraine Desmarais, French-Canadian jazz pianist and composer.
 24 – Mimi Fox, American guitarist and educator.
 29 – Doug Raney, American guitarist (died 2016).

September
 1 – Hilde Hefte, Norwegian singer.
 8 – Eivin One Pedersen, Norwegian accordionist and pianist (died 2012).
 12 – Brian Lynch, American trumpeter.
 15 – 
 Ned Rothenberg, American multi-instrumentalist and composer.
 George Howard, American saxophonist (died 1998).
 19 – Wolfgang Lackerschmid, German vibraphonist, bandleader, and composer.
 20 – Steve Coleman, African-American saxophonist, composer and band leader.

October
 9 – Geir Langslet, Norwegian pianist.
 10 – Johnny O'Neal, American pianist and vocalist.
 20 – Martin Taylor, British guitarist.
 22 – Jane Bunnett, Canadian soprano saxophonist, flautist, and bandleader.
 23
 Dianne Reeves, American singer.
 Svein Dag Hauge, Norwegian guitarist.
 26 – Mike LeDonne, American pianist and organist.
 27 – Ben Besiakov,  Danish pianist and keyboardist.
 28 – Liz Story, American pianist and composer.
 29 – David Chesky, American pianist, composer, producer, arranger, and co-founder of the label Chesky Records.
 31 – Bob Belden, American saxophonist, arranger, composer, bandleader, and producer (died 2015).

November
 1 – Tim Landers, American bass guitarist, composer and record producer.
 2 – Frank Kimbrough, American pianist.
 7
 Denise Jannah, Dutch vocalist.
 Iro Haarla, Finnish pianist and composer.
 Mikhail Alperin, Ukrainian born jazz pianist, member of the Moscow Art Trio, professor at the Norwegian Academy of Music (died 2018).
 10 – Louis Mhlanga, Zimbabwean guitarist.
 12 – Satoshi Inoue, Japanese guitarist.
 18 – Tiziano Tononi, Italian percussionist and composer.

December
 3 – Rob Waring, American-Norwegian vibraphonist.
 5 – Randy Johnston, American guitarist.
 12 – Geir Holmsen, Norwegian bassist.
 18 – Chris Murrell, American singer (died 2017).
 21 – Zeena Parkins, American harpist.
 24 – Ralph Moore, English saxophonist.
 27 – Karl Denson, American saxophonist, flutist, and vocalist.

Unknown date
 Chris Wilson, Australian singer and guitarist (died 2019).
 Gregg Karukas, smooth jazz pianist.
 Lee Pui Ming, Hong Kong-born American pianist, vocalist, and composer.
 Nicola Stilo, Italian flautist, guitarist, and pianist.
 Raymond Strid, Swedish drummer.
 Reiner Michalke, German musician and artistic director of the Moers Festival.

See also

 1950s in jazz
 List of years in jazz
 1956 in music

References

Bibliography

External links 
 History Of Jazz Timeline: 1956 at All About Jazz

Jazz
Jazz by year